William Richards School is a school in Kolar Gold Fields, India.

Beginning 
The school was started in 1970 with one teacher and nine students. Today it has more than one thousand students and the required faculty of teachers to cater to the needs of the students.

The school is run by the Anglo Indian Trust.

The school is located between Tennants Shaft and KEB.

Schools in Kolar district
Educational institutions established in 1970
1970 establishments in Mysore State